Allan, Alan or Allen Cunningham may refer to:

Alan Cunningham (1887–1983), World War II general
Allan Cunningham (author) (1784–1842), Scottish poet and author
Allan Cunningham (botanist) (1791–1839), British botanist and explorer
Allan Cunningham Anderson (1896–?), Canadian diplomat
Allan J. C. Cunningham (1842–1928), mathematician
Allen Cunningham (born 1977), American professional poker player
M. Allen Cunningham (born 1978), American author